A train shed is a building adjacent to a station building where the tracks and platforms of a railway station are covered by a roof.  It is also known as an overall roof.  Its primary purpose is to store and protect from the elements train cars not in use, The first train shed was built in 1830 at Liverpool's Crown Street Station.

The biggest train sheds were often built as an arch of glass and iron, while the smaller were built as normal pitched roofs.

The train shed with the biggest single span ever built was that at the second Philadelphia Broad Street Station, built in 1891.

Types of train shed

Early wooden train sheds

The earliest train sheds were wooden structures, often with unglazed openings to allow smoke and steam to escape. The oldest part of Bristol Temple Meads is a particularly fine – and large – example, designed by Isambard Kingdom Brunel with mock-hammerbeam roof.

Surviving examples include:
Ashburton, Devon, England (station closed)
Bo'ness, Falkirk, Scotland
Frome, Somerset, England
Kingswear, Devon, England
Thurso, Highland, Scotland
Wick, Highland, Scotland

Classic metal and glass

The middle of the nineteenth century saw many large stations covered by iron, steel and glass train sheds, inspired by The Crystal Palace at The Great Exhibition in 1851. The best have been described as "like cathedrals" and feature curved roofs; other structures have pitched roofs.

Surviving examples of curved roof train sheds include:
Amsterdam Centraal, Netherlands
Antwerpen-Centraal, Belgium
Bath Green Park railway station, England (converted to covered market and car park)
Bangkok, Thailand
Barcelona Estació de França, Catalonia, Spain
Brighton, England
Bristol Temple Meads, England
Copenhagen Central Station, Denmark
Darlington Bank Top, England
Frankfurt (Main) Hauptbahnhof, Germany
Glasgow Queen Street, Scotland
Hull Paragon, England

Gare de Lille Flandres, France
Köln Hauptbahnhof, Germany
Liverpool Lime Street, England
London Kings Cross, England
London Paddington, England
London St Pancras, England

Madrid Atocha, Spain (converted to station atrium)
Manchester Central, England (converted to conference centre)
Manchester Piccadilly, England
Milano Centrale, Italy
Newcastle Central, England
Prague Main Station, Czech Republic
Reading Terminal, Philadelphia, United States (converted to convention center)
Tanjung Priok, Jakarta, Indonesia
York, North Yorkshire, England
Vitebsky railway station, Saint Petersburg, Russia
Lviv Railway station, Ukraine

Surviving examples of pitched roof train sheds include:
Ballarat, Geelong (and No 2 Goods Shed Melbourne), Australia

Beverley, England
Bournemouth, England
Budapest Nyugati, Hungary
Budapest Keleti, Hungary
Carlisle Citadel, England
Chester, England
Crewe, England
Edinburgh Waverley, Scotland
Frome, England
Filey, England

Glasgow Central station, Scotland
Harrisburg Transportation Center, Harrisburg, Pennsylvania, United States
Kuala Lumpur, Malaysia
London Liverpool Street, England

Paris Gare du Nord, France
Paris Gare de Lyon, France
Preston, England
Stoke-on-Trent, England
Wemyss Bay, Scotland

Surviving examples of Bush-type, developed by American civil engineer Lincoln Bush, and related train sheds include:
Hoboken Terminal, Hoboken, New Jersey, United States
Union Station, Winnipeg, Manitoba, Canada
Toronto Union Station, Toronto, Ontario, Canada - designed by A.R. Ketterson
Communipaw Terminal, Jersey City, New Jersey, United States
Mount Royal Station used by Maryland Institute College of Art for its Sculpture program Baltimore, Maryland

Surviving examples of other train sheds include:
Pennsylvania Station (Newark), Newark, New Jersey, United States
The SEPTA platform area of 30th Street Station, Philadelphia, United States

Concrete

The middle of the twentieth century saw concrete used as a structural material.

Surviving examples include:
Cockfosters tube station, London, England
Uxbridge tube station, London, England
Volksdorf U-Bahn station, Hamburg, Germany

Modern steel and glass

After many years with few, if any, significant new train sheds, recent years have seen some major stations given graceful train sheds by using modern technology.

Examples include:
Berlin Hauptbahnhof, Berlin, Germany
Longyang Road station on the Shanghai Maglev Train line
Gwangmyeong Station, Seoul, South Korea
Jefferson Station, Philadelphia, United States (while station is located underground, it has above-ground structures for the purpose of sheltering the platforms and trains)
Stillwell Avenue subway station, New York City, United States
Waterloo International, London, England
Southern Cross station, Melbourne, Australia
Liège-Guillemins, Liège, Belgium
Manchester Victoria station, Manchester, England
In the United States, the Walt Disney World Monorail System has some trainsheds along its route, including the entrance-gate station and the main hall (or Grand Canyon Concourse) of the Contemporary Resort.

Open-air canopy

The Union Station (Denver, Colorado), Denver, Colorado, US, features an open-air canopy structure covered with Teflon.

Car barn

In North America tram cars, there called streetcars or trolleys, are sometimes stored in structures called car barns or car houses. These buildings are usually enclosed and provide cover for trams from the elements.

List of car barns:

 Roncesvalles Carhouse - Toronto
 Leslie Barns - Toronto
 Russell Carhouse (Connaught Barns) - Toronto
 Wychwood Barns (former St. Clair Carhouse) - now a community centre in Toronto
 Eglinton Maintenance and Storage Facility (Black Creek Carhouse) - Toronto
 Watertown Yard - Watertown, Massachusetts
 North Cambridge Carhouse - Cambridge, Massachusetts
 Plaistow Carhouse - Plaistow, New Hampshire
 Ashby Street Car Barn - Atlanta, Georgia
 Luzerne Carhouse - Philadelphia
 East Capitol Street Car Barn - Washington, DC
 Georgetown Car Barn - Washington, DC

See also 
 Bus station

References

Railway buildings and structures